Agneta Pleijel (born 1940) is a Swedish novelist, poet, playwright, journalist and literary critic. Among her plays are Ordning härskar i Berlin from 1979. Among her novels are Vindspejare from 1987 and Drottningens chirurg from 2006. She has been a professor at Dramatiska Institutet since 1992. She was awarded the Dobloug Prize in 1991 and the Swedish Academy Nordic Prize in 2018.

References

1940 births
Living people
20th-century Swedish novelists
21st-century Swedish novelists
Swedish women poets
20th-century Swedish dramatists and playwrights
Swedish literary critics
Women literary critics
Swedish journalists
Litteris et Artibus recipients
Dobloug Prize winners
20th-century Swedish women writers
21st-century Swedish women writers
21st-century Swedish dramatists and playwrights
Swedish women dramatists and playwrights
Swedish women novelists